Tylopilus brunneirubens is a bolete fungus of the genus Tylopilus. It was originally described in 1972 by E.J.H. Corner, and transferred to Tylopilus by Roy Watling in 1994. The fungus has been recorded from Malaysia and Zambia, and Singapore.

References

External links

brunneirubens
Fungi described in 1972
Fungi of Africa
Fungi of Asia
Taxa named by E. J. H. Corner